Andrey Igorevich Kharitonov (25 July 1959 – 23 June 2019) was a Soviet and Russian film and theater actor, director, screenwriter. He is best known for roles in films The Gadfly, The Star and Death of Joaquin Murieta and The Invisible Man.

Personal life
He tried to be protective about his private life. It is known that his wife's name is Olga, they have no children.

In January 2019, it became known that Andrey had stomach cancer. On June 23, 2019 Kharitonov died.

Filmography
 1980 —  The Gadfly as Arthur Burton (Felice Rivarez)
 1982 —  The Star and Death of Joaquin Murieta as Joaquin Murrieta
 1983 —  Mystery of Blackbirds as Lance Fortescue
 1984 —  The Invisible Man as Jonathan Griffin
 1987 —  The Life of Klim Samgin as Igor Turoboev
1989 —  Mystery Endhauz as George Challenger 
 2000 —  The Romanovs: An Imperial Family as Pierre Gilliard
 2006 —  Young Wolfhound as Debtor
 2009 —  The Best Movie 2 as Gaft
 2009 —   Wedding Ring as Denis Kolesnikov
 2010 — The Devil's Flower as episode
 2011 —  Island Unnecessary People as Konstantin Elizarovich Volzhansky
 2012 —  Podporuchik Romashov as Nazansky

Recognition and awards
 The Gadfly:
 Prize of the Komsomol in the CCF,  Early 1980  in Kyiv (1980)
 Golden Nymph Award  for Best Actor at VANA in Monte Carlo (1981)
 Shevchenko National Prize (1982)
 Thirst for Passion:
 Special prize in the Cinema for The Elite In the EC Kinotavr (1991)
 Jury Award in category Debut on CF Literature and Cinema (1995)
 Commander of the Order of the Golden Serving Art of the International Union of Charitable Organizations of the World (2007)
 The winner of the XXII International Film Forum Golden Knight (2013) for supporting actor (Podporuchik Romashov)

References

External links

 
 Андрей Харитонов at the Voteactors.ru

1959 births
2019 deaths
Actors from Kyiv
Soviet male film actors
Russian male film actors
Soviet male stage actors
Russian male stage actors
Soviet male television actors
Russian male television actors
Russian film directors
Recipients of the Shevchenko National Prize
Kyiv National I. K. Karpenko-Kary Theatre, Cinema and Television University alumni
Deaths from cancer in Russia
Deaths from stomach cancer
Film people from Kyiv